Crimson Editor is a freeware text editor for Microsoft Windows. It is typically used as a source code editor and HTML editor. The author was Ingyu Kang.

Features

Crimson Editor features Windows shell integration, tabbed document interface, syntax highlighting, multiple undo/redo, column mode editing, bracket matching, auto-indentation, spell checking, direct editing of text files in FTP and the integration with compilers. Unicode (although only for the characters within the default character set of Windows) and various newlines are supported. Crimson Editor also supports the use of macros. The built-in calculator can evaluate simple expressions. Basic mathematics functions, and date functions are also available.

Reception
Crimson Editor has been extensively reviewed and well received. It has been described as a very good editor and pseudo-IDE interface for programmers to use. It has been highlighted that it has a good set of features, syntax-highlighting for many formats, and includes integrated FTP. However, there are some memory issues with several (full-project) files, and it sometimes crashes.

See also
 Comparison of text editors
 List of text editors

References

External links
 

Windows text editors
Windows-only freeware